Cape Adams is an abrupt rock scarp marking the south tip of Bowman Peninsula and forming the north side of the entrance to Gardner Inlet, on the east coast of Palmer Land in Antarctica. It was discovered by the Ronne Antarctic Research Expedition (RARE), 1947–48, under Ronne, and named by him for Lt. Charles J. Adams of the then USAAF, pilot with the expedition.

References

Headlands of Palmer Land